Dino Marcan and Tristan-Samuel Weissborn were the defending champions but chose not to defend their title.

Aliaksandr Bury and Lloyd Harris won the title after defeating Gong Maoxin and Zhang Ze 6–3, 6–4 in the final.

Seeds

Draw

References
 Main Draw

Kunming Open - Men's Doubles
2018 Men's Doubles